The Jordanbach is a river of Lower Saxony, Germany. It is a right-bank tributary of the Böhme.

The Jordanbach lies entirely within the borough of Walsrode which is part of Heidekreis district in Lower Saxony. It flows in a southerly direction through Altenboitzen and discharges southwest of the village into the Böhme.

The Jordanbach gives its name to a railway line between Bomlitz and Altenboitzen, that is nowadays only used for tourist purposes, such as the special trains of the Heath Express run by the Lüneburg Transport Society (Arbeitsgemeinschaft Verkehrsfreunde Lüneburg). This section of the Verden – Walsrode line operated by the Verden-Walsrode Railway, which was formed in 1910, is also called the Jordan-Bomlitz Railway, because it runs from the valley of the Jordanbach to the Bomlitz valley.

References

See also 
List of rivers of Lower Saxony

Rivers of Lower Saxony
Heidekreis
Walsrode
Rivers of Germany